Syed Haidar Ali  is a Bangladeshi politician and the former Member of Parliament of Pabna-2.

Early life
Syed Haidar Ali was born in Pabna to a Bengali Muslim family of Syeds.

Career
Ali was active in the six point movement and Bengali language movement, and took part in the Bangladesh Liberation War of 1971. He was elected to parliament from Pabna-2 as an Awami League candidate following the 1973 Bangladeshi general elections.

References

Awami League politicians
Living people
1st Jatiya Sangsad members
Year of birth missing (living people)
Bangladeshi people of Arab descent
People from Pabna District